Proxenus mendosa is a species of cutworm or dart moth in the family Noctuidae. It is found in North America.

The MONA or Hodges number for Proxenus mendosa is 9649.

References

Further reading

 
 
 

Caradrinini
Articles created by Qbugbot
Moths described in 1927